Emilia Yordanova (born 5 May 1989) is a Bulgarian biathlete. She competed in the 2014/15 World Cup season, and represented Bulgaria at the Biathlon World Championships 2015 in Kontiolahti.

References

1989 births
Living people
Bulgarian female biathletes
Universiade medalists in biathlon
Olympic biathletes of Bulgaria
Biathletes at the 2018 Winter Olympics
Universiade bronze medalists for Bulgaria
Competitors at the 2011 Winter Universiade
21st-century Bulgarian women